Arnaud Clément and Michaël Llodra were the defending champions but chose not compete together.
Clément partnered with Nicolas Mahut and Llodra partnered with Julien Benneteau. They met in the semifinals and Benneteau & Llodra won this match 7–6(0), 6–4. One day later they defeated 6–4, 6–3 Julian Knowle and Robert Lindstedt in the final.

Seeds

Draw

Draws

External links
Main Draw Doubles

Open 13
Open 13 - Doubles